Thakurgaon (Thakurgaon Jela also Thakurgaon Zila) is a district in the north-western side of Bangladesh. It is a part of the Rangpur Division and borders India to the west. It was established as a mahakuma in 1860 consisting of 6 thanas named Thakurgaon sadar, Baliadangi, Pirganj, Ranishankail, Haripur and Ruhia. In 1947, it was re-established as a mahakuma including 3 thanas of Jalpaiguri and a thana of kochbihar of India. In 1981, Atoari was included in the new Panchagarh district and the area was shrunk in just 5 thanas. It was then established as a district on 1 February 1984.

Subdistricts
There are 5 upazilas, 6 thanas, 53 unions, 647 mouzas and 1016 villages in Thakurgaon. The Upazilas in this district are:
Thakurgaon Sadar Upazila
Baliadangi Upazila
Haripur Upazila
Ranisankail Upazila
Pirganj Upazila

There is also an upazila named Pirganj under Rangpur district.

History

During British rule Thakurgaon was a tehsil (a district subdivision). In 1947 at the time of the Partition of India, Thakurgaon Subdivision became part of the newly established Dinajpur District of East Bengal. In 1984 Thakurgaon subdivision was split off Dinajpur and became a separate district (i.e. Thakurgaon District). Before 1879 Thakurgaon District was ruled my Maithil Brahmins and Bengali Brahmins like Bikhash Jha, Barun Thakur and Vidhenesh Roy. Until 1947 Thakurgaon district had a just Hindu majority population of 52%. Most people believe Thakurgaon district has got its name from Barun Thakur, a Maithil Brahmin.

Geography
Thakurgaon is in the north west corner of Bangladesh, it is about 467 km from Dhaka, the capital of Bangladesh. It is surrounded by Dinajpur district on its south, Panchagarh district to the east and India on its west and north sides, it is a part of the Himalayan plain land. Highest average temperature of this district is 33.5° Celsius and lowest average is 10.05° Celsius.

Demographics

According to the 2011 Bangladesh census, Thakurgaon District had a population of 1,390,042, of which 701,281 were males and 688,761 females. Rural population was 1,228,733 (88.40%) while the urban population was 161,309 (11.60%). Thakurgaon district had a literacy rate of 48.71% for the population 7 years and above: 52.97% for males and 44.40% for females.

Muslims make up 76.70% of the population, while Hindus are 22.26% and Christians 0.57% of the population.

Economy
In Bangladesh as a whole agriculture is the basis of the economy, and Thakurgaon has been striving for a long time to be economically productive, agriculture forming a major part of the districts economy. Thakurgaon produces many agricultural products, such as rice, wheat, sugarcane, seasonal vegetables and fruits etc. The sugarcane plantation - TSM (Thakurgaon Sugar Mill)--is part of the BSFIC. These become the main livelihood of the native. Poultry firms are quite productive business in Thakurgaon, there are several cold-stores in the district. Different businesses for producing and repairing agricultural tools have grown up.

However the community's distance from the capital causes difficulties in getting sufficient technical and logistic support and in transporting local products to the national market. It is not easy for the investors to set up their business far away from the center of national trade and commerce.

Places of interest

There are various places of interest in the district, these include:
 The Tangon River
 Senua Bridge
 Old Air Port, destroyed during the second world war, situated at Modergonj beside of Arazipaickpara
 Jomidar Mosjid at Shibganj
 Balia Mosjid at Balia Union 
 The Fair of Nekmordon
 Ramrai Dighi, it is a pond having  of area. A beautiful tourist spot.
 King's Palace
 The river of Kulic
 KhuniaDhighi Memorial
 Palace of King Tonko Nath
 Gorkoi Heritage
 500 acre shal garden on the bank of the Tangon River
 Horinmari Amgach (Stand by 3 bigha area )
Haripur Rajbari
Gorokkhonath temple
Ranishankail Jomidar Bari
Jagdal Rajbari
Sangah Shahi mosque
Fatehpur mosque
Shalbari mosque
Bhulli badh

Culture
There is a versatile practice of culture in the district; few festivals and cultural events are regularly arranged there. Alpona Sansad arranges Boishakhi Mela in every Bangla new year. Held "Eid Fair" at the occasion of Eid-Ul-Adha & Eid-Ul-Fitre every year at Thakurgaon Boro Matth also.  Several drama clubs (Sapla Natto Gosty-Estd.1974, Nischintopur Theater-1983 etc. ) practice and perform regularly and stage original and famous dramas every month. Dhamer Gaan is a unique traditional cultural invention of Thakurgaon people. The existing 10 tribes in this area enjoy their own heritage and cultural practices.

Notable people
 Mirza Fakhrul Islam Alamgir Secretary general of Bangladesh Nationalist Party
 Ramesh Chandra Sen Member of parliament
Shishir Bhattacharjee famous painter, cartoonist
Litu Anam famous actor, TV personality
Musa Ibrahim first Bangladeshi to climb Everest
Dabirul Islam 7-term Member of parliament of Awami league

Gallery

See also

 Haripur

Districts of Bangladesh

Notes

References

 
Districts of Bangladesh